Nick Lowe (born 1956) is a British classical scholar and film critic.

He is a reader in classics in the Department of Classics and Philosophy at Royal Holloway, a constituent college of the University of London, with interests including narratology and reception of Greek antiquity in historical fiction.

Lowe is also a film reviewer for the science-fiction magazine Interzone, writing the column Mutant Popcorn since the mid-1980s; he won a British Science Fiction Association Award for the column in 2009. The 25th anniversary of his column was celebrated by a special issue of Interzone in 2010, including reprints of his first reviews and an interview with Lowe.

Early life and education
He was born in Manchester, England, and raised in Glasgow, Scotland, before going to read classics at the University of Cambridge, where he received his Master of Arts and Doctor of Philosophy. His doctoral advisor was Geoffrey Kirk.

Career
He taught classics at three different colleges in the University of London before being appointed lecturer in Greek literature at Royal Holloway.

Books
 Theatre Ancient and Modern (2000), edited with Hardwick, L., Ireland, S. & Macintosh, F., Open University Press.
 The Classical Plot and the Invention of Western Narrative (2000), Cambridge:  Cambridge University Press.
 Comedy (2008). Cambridge: Cambridge University Press. (Greece & Rome: New Surveys in the Classics).
 Erôs in Ancient Greece (2013), edited with Sanders, E., Thumiger, C. & Carey, C., Oxford University Press.

See also

 List of film critics
 List of Glaswegians
 List of people from Manchester
 List of University of Cambridge members
 List of University of London people

References

External links
 Nick Lowe's home page at RHUL

1956 births
20th-century scholars
21st-century scholars
Academics of Royal Holloway, University of London
Alumni of the University of Cambridge
English classical scholars
English film critics
British speculative fiction critics
Living people
Science fiction critics
Scottish classical scholars
Scottish science fiction writers
Writers from Glasgow
Writers from Manchester